Jorge Eladio Bolaño Correa (born 28 April 1977) is a Colombian retired footballer who played as a midfielder.

He played for the Colombia national football team and was a participant at the 1998 FIFA World Cup.

International career

International goals
Scores and results list Colombia's goal tally first.

References

Notes

People from Santa Marta
1977 births
Living people
Colombian footballers
Colombian expatriate footballers
Expatriate footballers in Italy
Categoría Primera A players
Serie A players
Serie B players
Atlético Junior footballers
Parma Calcio 1913 players
U.C. Sampdoria players
U.S. Lecce players
Modena F.C. players
Cúcuta Deportivo footballers
Colombia international footballers
1998 FIFA World Cup players
1999 Copa América players
2000 CONCACAF Gold Cup players
Association football midfielders
Sportspeople from Magdalena Department
20th-century Colombian people
21st-century Colombian people